Qarah Saqal (also Romanized as Qarah Saqāl) is a village in Aliabad Rural District, in the Central District of Hashtrud County, East Azerbaijan Province, Iran. At the 2006 census, its population was 297, in 75 families.

References 

Towns and villages in Hashtrud County